Dirk Karkuth (9 January 1962 – 14 January 2003) was a German football manager.

References

1962 births
2003 deaths
1. FSV Mainz 05 players
Association football defenders
German football managers
Rot-Weiss Essen managers
1. FC Saarbrücken managers
1. FSV Mainz 05 managers
Chemnitzer FC managers
2. Bundesliga managers
German footballers
Sportspeople from Gelsenkirchen
Footballers from North Rhine-Westphalia